Mallory Deluce (born April 13, 1989) is a Canadian ice hockey forward for the Wisconsin Badgers women's ice hockey program. She was drafted 11th overall by Toronto CWHL in the 2011 CWHL Draft. She was named to the Canadian National Women's Hockey team roster that competed in the 2011 IIHF Eight Nations Tournament. In 2015, she was named the recipient of the Isobel Gathorne-Hardy Award.

Playing career
Deluce won a gold medal with the London Devilettes at OWHA provincials (Atom AA) in 2000. She was a member of the Bluewater Hawks Intermediate AA team for three seasons and was a two time recipient of the team's MVP award. With Bluewater, she won the PWHL championship in 2003. In the same year, she won a gold medal with Bluewater at the OWHA provincials. Deluce captained Ontario Red to a gold medal at the November 2005 National Women's Under-18 championships. In 2005–06 she led the Provincial Women's Hockey League in points with 135 (49 goals, 86 assists) in 67 games played. Deluce competed for Ontario at the Canadian Under-18 National Championships in 2005 and 2006 and won the gold medal twice. In addition, she served as the team captain of the 2006 squad. Deluce also played for the Mississauga Jr. Aeros of the National Women's Hockey League.

Canada Winter Games
At the 2007 Canada Winter Games, she captained Team Ontario to a gold medal. In a game versus Newfoundland at the Canada Winter Games (March 5, 2007), Deluce was on a line with Rebecca Johnston and Jenn Wakefield. The three combined for 12 points in a 19–0 victory.

NCAA
Her freshman year with the Wisconsin Badgers was in 2007–08. Her 31 points ranked her ninth in the NCAA in points by a rookie. Her 12 goals ranked fifth on the Badgers. Deluce played in 39 of 41 games. On October 20, she scored a hat trick versus WCHA rival St. Cloud State. As a rookie, Deluce played in the NCAA championship game. The following season, Deluce accumulated 32 points, 12 goals and 20 assists. For the season, she had 11 multiple-point games and won the NCAA Frozen Four.

The 2009–10 season was her junior year and she played in 32 games, compiling 32 points (13 goals and 19 assists). She had a multi-goal game against the Providence Friars on November 28, 2009. From October 11 to November 7, she had a career-high seven-game point streak. In addition, she ranked second on the team in scoring.

In 2010–11, Deluce was named an assistant captain. On October 1, she earned two points against RPI. In a two-game series on December 4 and 5 versus WCHA rival North Dakota, Deluce had three points.

Hockey Canada
Deluce was Invited to participate in the 2007 Canadian National Women's Team Fall Festival from September 1–8 in Prince George, British Columbia. She was also selected to participate in Hockey Canada's 2010 Summer Strength and Conditioning Camp (from May 25–30). Deluce won gold at the 2010 MLP Cup in Ravensburg, Germany. She repeated the feat at the 2011 MLP Cup in Kreuzlingen, Switzerland. Deluce assisted Canada to four shutout wins with five points. In March 2011, she was invited to the Canadian national women's ice hockey team selection camp to determine the final roster for the 2011 IIHF Women's World Championships. On August 31, 2011, Deluce scored a goal as Canada lost for just the second time in 66 all-time international meetings against Sweden by a 6–4 mark.

Personal
In high school, Deluce also competed in cross country and soccer

Awards and honours
WCHA All-Rookie Team (2007–08)
 WCHA Rookie of the Week (Week of Oct. 15, 2007)
 WCHA Rookie of the Week (Week of Oct. 22, 2007)
 WCHA Rookie of the Week (Week of February 18, 2008)
WCHA All-Star Team (2009–10)
Wisconsin assistant captain (2010–11)
Isobel Gathorne-Hardy Award (2015)

References

1989 births
Canadian women's ice hockey forwards
Living people
Ice hockey people from Toronto
Toronto Furies players
Wisconsin Badgers women's ice hockey players